Porte Maillot is a station on Paris Métro Line 1 and as Neuilly – Porte Maillot on the RER C. The station replaces another station of the same name, the original terminus of Line 1, which was demolished and moved in 1936.

The name derives from the Porte Maillot, a former gate to the Bois de Boulogne, whose name derives perhaps from maille, or croquet. The present day Porte Maillot is in the centre of a roundabout close to the modern Palais des congrès de Paris which the station serves. The centre of the roundabout is a small park, providing a midpoint on the long view between the arches of La Defense and the Arc de Triomphe.

History
The first station called "Porte Maillot" opened in 1900 and was the terminus of Line 1, and was therefore a loop, allowing trains to turn around without reversing. Like Porte Dauphine and Porte de Vincennes, it was arranged with a central waiting area and tracks on either side, with two tunnels. The station was replaced with a new station a short distance to the west with the extension of Line 1 to Pont de Neuilly in 1937.

The new line dives down and passes under the old loop. In 1992 this old station was turned into a reception area by the RATP, now the "Espace Maillot". The new platforms were built 105 metres long to accommodate 7-car trains in the future, a plan which has never been realised.

Since 1988 and the opening of the northern branch of the C Branch of the RER, this station has served the Neuilly – Porte Maillot station of the RER C. The two stations are connected by a long corridor.

The RER A passes beneath the station, but does not stop. An extension of RER E through Port Maillot from Gare d'Haussmann – Saint-Lazare to La Défense and then towards Mantes-la-Jolie is under consideration.

Work is currently underway, but nearing completion to convert "Espace Maillot" into a light maintenance facility for the new MP 05 rolling stock, which are fully automated.

Station layout

Tourism
The Porte Maillot is an entrance to the Bois de Boulogne, and is located between the avenue Charles de Gaulle of Neuilly-sur-Seine and the avenue de la Grande Armée of Paris.

The Palais des congrès can be accessed directly via the corridor between the metro and RER stations.

The roof over the tracks between the RER station and the Pereire station has been converted into a walkway for pedestrians.

Gallery

References

Paris Métro stations in the 16th arrondissement of Paris
Paris Métro stations in the 17th arrondissement of Paris
Railway stations in France opened in 1936